Stanley Weston  (né Weinburger; September 25, 1919 – April 11, 2002) was an American publisher, sportswriter, artist and photographer. He promoted the sport of boxing and professional wrestling throughout his career. Weston started Pro Wrestling Illustrated, a professional wrestling magazine, as well as 20 other magazines over his career. Weston was inducted into the International Boxing Hall of Fame in 2006.

Career
Weston became enamored with the sport of boxing at the age of 10 after his father brought home a copy of The Ring magazine. At the age of 13, Weston met neighbor and The Ring founder Nat Fleischer. In 1937 Fleischer hired him as copy boy. Weston was soon colorizing black and white portraits of boxing figures with oils. In December 1939, Weston, a budding artist, painted a portrait of Billy Conn that would be the first of 57 Ring covers painted by Weston. Daughter Toby Weston Cone said of her father, he "never liked going to boxing matches but was extremely interested in the sport. He felt it paralleled life in many ways."

Weston served in the United States Army during the World War II, from 1941 until 1946. He returned to civilian life and The Ring in 1945, but left the publication in 1951. He returned to the Army during the Korean War, with the rank of Major, and retired in 1966. 

He launched Boxing Illustrated/Wrestling News in 1958 and published it until 1964, successfully competing with The Ring. In 1989, fifty-two years after joining The Ring as a stock boy, Weston purchased the magazine that gave him his first job.

He was also an author who penned several of the definitive books on boxing history, including History of the Heavyweights, The Heavyweight Champions, The Best of The Ring, The Chronicle of Boxing and, with Steve Farhood, The Ring: Boxing the 20th Century.

Personal life
Weston was born to Bessie (Biegeleisen) and Jacob Weinburger in the Bronx. He was married to Hope Patrick (died 1980) for 38 years. He died on April 11, 2002 from cancer. He was survived by two daughters, Toby Weston Cone and Barbara Harris, along with four grandchildren and five great-grandchildren.

Throughout his seven decades long career in boxing, he amassed one of the largest collections of boxing memorabilia in the world.

Awards and accomplishments
International Boxing Hall of Fame
Inductee - Observer (2006)

Pro Wrestling Illustrated
PWI Stanley Weston Award (1992)

References

American sportswriters
Sports photographers
International Boxing Hall of Fame inductees
Boxing writers
1919 births
2002 deaths
Deaths from cancer in New York (state)